The men's 3 miles at the 1962 British Empire and Commonwealth Games as part of the athletics programme was held at the Perry Lakes Stadium on Monday 26 November 1962.

The event was won by the defending and Olympic champion as well as the world and Games record holder, New Zealand's Murray Halberg in 13:34.2. Halberg finished ahead of Australian Ron Clarke and Canadian Bruce Kidd who won the 6 mile event earlier in the meet.

Records

Final

References

Men's 3 miles
1962